The 2009 NASCAR Mini Stock Series season was the first to be run under this name. It is the feeder division of the NASCAR Corona Series. It was formerly known as NASCAR Mexico T4 Series. Ernesto Guerrero ended up as series champion, edging out Erik Mondragón by just two points.

Cars

This year the series entered a transition stage, in which the field of front-wheel drive touring cars used in the T4 Series in previous years was changed for rear-wheel drive stock cars, as a way to help the drivers develop their abilities and prepare for the next steps in their careers. However, for this season the old front-wheel drive cars were grandfathered into the series.

Ironically, in the first two races of the season, the newly built rear-wheel drive cars were affected by reliability issues that have given some advantage to the drivers running with the old car.

It was the first four-cylinder series in NASCAR since the mid-1990s Goody's Dash Series in the United States, which was a 4-cylinder series from its 1975 inception as the Baby Grand National, until 1998, when six-cylinder engines were permitted.

Chevrolet Astra and Mazda3 was used in this season.

Drivers
These are the entries for the 2009 season.

(R) Denotes Rookie.

Race calendar
The race calendar for this season and results is as follows:

Results

Races

 Qualifying washed out.
 Qualifying washed out.

Standings

(key) Bold - Pole position awarded by time. Italics - Pole position set by final practice results or rainout. * – Most laps led.

See also

2009 NASCAR Sprint Cup Series
2009 NASCAR Nationwide Series
2009 NASCAR Camping World Truck Series
2009 NASCAR Camping World East Series
2009 NASCAR Camping World West Series
2009 NASCAR Canadian Tire Series
2009 NASCAR Corona Series

References

NASCAR Mini Stocks Series season

NASCAR Mexico Series